The second government of Giorgi Gakharia was the government (cabinet) of Georgia, with Giorgi Gakharia as its head as the country's Prime Minister from 24 December 2020 to February 18, 2021. The cabinet was formed after the 2020 parliamentary elections, in which the victorious Georgian Dream party nominated Giorgi Gakharia as its candidate for prime minister for a second term. Gakharia presented his cabinet to parliament on December 14. The Georgian Dream backed his cabinet and approved it by a parliamentary majority on December 24. The second Gakharia administration was dissolved after his resignation on February 18, 2021, over a dispute within his party on the arrest of opposition leader Nika Melia. The political leadership of Georgian Dream, including the party's founder Bidzina Ivanishvili, later branded Gakharia "a coward and a traitor" for stepping down. Gakharia went on to form a new opposition political party.

Ministers

Notes

Government of Georgia (country)
2020 establishments in Georgia (country)
Cabinets established in 2020
2021 disestablishments in Georgia (country)
Cabinets disestablished in 2021